"Girl in the Tower" is a song from the soundtrack of the computer game King's Quest VI. Mark Seibert wrote the song in 1992. The song is a love ballad between two of the game's principal characters, Prince Alexander and Princess Cassima. Accordingly, the song elaborates upon Seibert's "Princess Cassima's Theme" from the King's Quest V soundtrack. "Girl in the Tower" was digitally recorded, with Ron Delarm on guitar and Bob Bergthold and Debbie Seibert performing vocals. The vocal version of the track plays only in the CD-rom version of King's Quest VI, although even this was remarkable in 1992.

When King's Quest VI was first released on floppy disc, a pamphlet was included with the game listing various radio stations to which the song had been sent. Buyers were encouraged to call in and request that the song be played, but this campaign was unsuccessful.

According to Quest Studios, Mark Seibert comments about the single: "'Girl In The Tower' was an idea I came up with when I found out that 'King's Quest VI' was going to be a love story between Alexander and Cassima. I thought this would be a perfect opportunity to write a top 40 type love ballad to be sung as a duet. As I explored the possibilities, I found some of the motifs from the original Cassima theme worked well in this style."

In Space Quest 6, when Roger gives a "morphin"-spiked donut to one of the shuttlebay security guards, the guard transforms into several strange characters including Michigan J Frog and Sir Elton John playing Girl in the Tower on piano.

External links
Sierra Soundtrack Collection with option for MP3 download of "Princess Cassima" and Girl in the Tower
King's Quest VI entry in Gamespot's Greatest Games of All Time
game-nostalgia.com article about King's Quest VI featuring a quote from Ken Williams about the failed attempted at promoting the song.

1992 songs
King's Quest
Pop ballads
Songs written for video games